The 2004 Delaware Democratic presidential primary was held on February 3, 2004 as part of the 2004 United States Democratic presidential primaries. Frontrunner John Kerry easily won the primary while Senator Joe Lieberman came second.

As the primary approached Joe Lieberman said that victory in the Delaware primary was required in order for his campaign to continue. He had visited the state four times and got the endorsement of Democratic senator Thomas R. Carper. After his defeat in the primary Lieberman withdrew from the race for the nomination.

Exit polls showed that over half of voters who took part in the primary said they were 'angry' with the administration of George W. Bush and over 80% said they opposed the decision to go to war with Iraq.

Polling

Source: Delaware - 2004 Presidential Polls

Results

Source: 2004 Presidential Democratic Primary Election Results - Delaware

References

Delaware
2004 Delaware elections
2004